The men's +84 kg competition in karate at the 2022 Mediterranean Games was held on 27 June at the Mohammed ben Ahmed CCO Hall 03 and 06 in Oran.

Results

Bracket

Repechage

References

M84+